Marc Perrodon (31 August 1878 – 22 February 1939) was a French fencer. He won a silver medal in the team sabre competition at the 1920 Summer Olympics. A 1924 Pathé-Revue newsreel shows him in action. He is described as a champion French sabre fencer.

References

External links
 

1878 births
1939 deaths
People from Vendôme
French male sabre fencers
Olympic fencers of France
Fencers at the 1908 Summer Olympics
Fencers at the 1920 Summer Olympics
Fencers at the 1924 Summer Olympics
Olympic silver medalists for France
Olympic medalists in fencing
Medalists at the 1920 Summer Olympics
Sportspeople from Loir-et-Cher